TSS Mellifont was a twin screw passenger steamship operated by the Lancashire and Yorkshire Railway from 1903 to 1928.

History
She was built by Vickers Limited of Barrow-in-Furness for the  Lancashire and Yorkshire Railway in 1903.

She operated from Goole on continental services to Zeebrugge and Antwerp from 1906 to 1912. The Mellifont reverted to the Drogheda-Liverpool route in 1912 when the remaining ex-Drogheda Steam Packet Company paddlers, Iverna and Norah Creina, were withdrawn from service.

Passenger service between Drogheda and Liverpool was discontinued in 1914, but the Mellifont remained on the route in freight service. She passed into the hands of the London & North Western Railway in 1922 and the London, Midland & Scottish Railway in 1923. When the LMS passed the Drogheda-Liverpool route to the British & Irish Steam Packet Company in 1928, the Mellifont was shifted to freight service between Holyhead and Greenore. She was scrapped in 1933.

References

1903 ships
Ships built in Barrow-in-Furness
Passenger ships of the United Kingdom
Ships of the Lancashire and Yorkshire Railway
Ships of the London and North Western Railway
Steamships of the United Kingdom